Café Slavia is a café in Prague, Czech Republic, located on the corner of Národní street and Smetanovo nábřeží, next to the Vltava river and opposite the National Theatre. It was opened in August 1884. Poet and novelist Rainer Maria Rilke regularly spent time in the café. It was known for its associations with Prague's dissident community, hosting people such as Václav Havel, who would later become his country's president, and poet Jiří Kolář during the normalization period. It was also known as a place for writers, poets and other intellectuals to meet and discuss their ideas.  The café was closed in 1992 due to a legal dispute but re-opened in 1997. Café Slavia has been described as Prague's "best-known café".

References

External links

Coffeehouses and cafés in the Czech Republic
1884 establishments in Austria-Hungary
Restaurants in Prague